Colonel Sir Henry Charles Legge  (4 November 1852 – 20 June 1924) was a British soldier and courtier.

Legge was the second son of William Legge, 5th Earl of Dartmouth, and his wife Augusta (née Lady Augusta Finch), and was therefore entitled to the style "The Honourable". He was educated at Eton College and commissioned into the Coldstream Guards in 1872. He retired from the Army in 1899.

He served as an equerry in the Royal Household from 1893 to 1915, when he became Paymaster to the King's Household and an extra equerry to the king. He retired in 1920. He was appointed Knight Commander of the Royal Victorian Order (KCVO) in 1910 and was promoted to Knight Grand Cross (GCVO) in the 1920 Birthday Honours.

Family
Legge married Amy Gwendoline Lambart (1852–1927) in 1884. They had two children, Victoria Alexandrina Stella Legge (1885–1965) and Nigel Walter Henry Legge (1889–1914), who legally changed his name to Nigel Walter Legge-Bourke by Royal Licence on 26 April 1911.

Victoria (Vita) Alexandrina Stella Legge married Major Richard Gerard Wellesley Williams-Bulkeley (1887–1918), son of Sir Richard Henry Williams-Bulkeley, 12th Baronet, in 1909. He died in March 1918 from wounds received in action in World War I. They had one daughter and two sons. The elder son, Richard Harry David Williams-Bulkeley (1911–1992), succeeded his grandfather as the 13th Baronet. The younger son, David, died in South Africa in 1937, aged 21, in mysterious circumstances. The daughter, Sylvia, married Eustace Clearey. In 1921, Vita married Roland Frank Holdway Norman (died 1944). They had a son, Robert Norman, who was educated at Eton and killed in action in 1944.

Nigel Walter Legge-Bourke married Lady Victoria Alexandrina Wynn-Carington (1892–1966), daughter of Charles Wynn-Carington, 1st Marquess of Lincolnshire, in 1913. He served as a lieutenant in the Coldstream Guards, and was killed in action in World War I in October 1914. Their son was Sir Harry Legge-Bourke (1914–1973), whose granddaughters are cousins Tiggy and Eleanor Legge-Bourke.

Footnotes

References
Obituary, The Times, 21 June 1924.

1852 births
1924 deaths
People educated at Eton College
Coldstream Guards officers
Knights Grand Cross of the Royal Victorian Order
Members of London County Council
Equerries
Younger sons of earls
Henry